The Eastern Coastal Plains is a wide stretch of landmass of India, lying between the Eastern Ghats and the Bay of Bengal. It is wider and leveled than the Western Coastal Plains and stretches from Tamil Nadu in the south to West Bengal in the north through Andhra Pradesh and Odisha. Chilka Lake is a brackish water lake along the eastern coastal plain. It lies in the state of Odisha and stretches to the south of the Mahanadi Delta.

Deltas of many of India's rivers form a major portion of these plains. The Mahanadi, Godavari, Krishna and Kaveri rivers drain these plains. The width of the plains varies between 100 and 120 km (62 to 80 miles).

It is locally known as Utkal Plains in the Northern part between Cossye and Rushikulya Rivers, Northern Circars in the Central part between Rushikulya and Krishna Rivers and, as Coromandel Coast in the Southern part from the south of river Krishna till the Southern tip of Mainland India at Cape Comorin where it merges with the Western coastal plains.

Agriculture
Agriculture on the eastern Coastal Plain primarily consists of paddy. Other crops include Linseed, Wheat, Jowar, Gram and Groundnut.

See also
Western Coastal Plains

References 

Plains of India
Coasts of India